Josef Liesler (19 September 1912, in Vidolice near Kadaň – 23 August 2005, in Prague) was a Czech surrealist painter, graphic designer, illustrator, exlibris and postage stamp designer.

He studied art at University of the Architecture and Structural Engineering, Prague in 1934-38 under professors Cyril Bouda, Oldřich Blažíček, and Josef Sejpka. He became a member of the Mánes Union of Fine Arts (1942) and SČUG Hollar (1945). He illustrated over one hundred book titles and he created many drawings of postage stamps and exlibris. He received a UNESCO award for the finest stamp design (Hydrologic decade). His production is represented in many prominent Czech and international collections, including the Galleria degli Uffizi in Florence.

He was married to Blazena Málková and has two sons.

References

External links

 Josef Liesler prints

1912 births
2005 deaths
Czech illustrators
Recipients of Medal of Merit (Czech Republic)